Gruta dos Ratões is a cave in the Azores. It is located in Angra do Heroísmo, on the island of Terceira.

Angra do Heroísmo
Gruta Ratoes